K227 or K-227 may refer to:

K-227 (Kansas highway), a former state highway in Kansas
HMS Itchen (K227), a former UK Royal Navy ship